Pradeep Trimbak Rawat (b 1956) is an Indian politician from the Bharatiya Janata Party and a former Member of Parliament (MP), elected from Pune (Lok Sabha constituency) in 1999 to the 13th Lok Sabha. He contested from Pune again in 2004 but lost to Suresh Kalmadi of Congress.

External links 
 Profile on Lok Sabha website

1956 births
Living people
India MPs 1999–2004
Marathi politicians
Bharatiya Janata Party politicians from Maharashtra
Lok Sabha members from Maharashtra
People from Jalgaon district
Politicians from Pune